The 2021–22 season was the 53rd season of competitive association football in Australia.

National teams

Men's senior

Friendly
The following is a list of friendlies played by the men's senior national team in 2021–22.

FIFA World Cup qualification

AFC Third Round Group B

AFC Fourth-round play-off

Inter-Confederation play-offs

Men's under 23

Friendlies
The following is a list of friendlies played by the men's under 23 national team in 2021–22.

Olympic Games

AFC U-23 Asian Cup qualification

AFC U-23 Asian Cup

Women's senior

Friendlies
The following is a list of friendlies played by the women's national team in 2021–22.

Olympic Games

AFC Women's Asian Cup

Women's under-20

Australia was to host one of the groups in the first round of qualification for the 2022 AFC U-20 Women's Asian Cup, between 14–22 August 2021 in Shepparton, Victoria. However, in July 2021, the Asian Football Confederation confirmed that the competition was cancelled due to the COVID-19 pandemic.

Friendlies
The following is a list of friendlies played by the Women's U-20 team in 2021–22.

Women's under-17

Australia was to host one of the groups in the first round of qualification for the 2022 AFC U-17 Women's Asian Cup, between 18–26 September 2021 in Cessnock, New South Wales. However, in July 2021, the Asian Football Confederation confirmed that the competition was cancelled due to the COVID-19 pandemic.

AFC competitions

AFC Champions League

Qualifiers:
 Melbourne City as 2020–21 A-League regular season premiers
 Melbourne Victory as 2021 FFA Cup winners
 Sydney FC as 2020–21 A-League regular season runners-up

Melbourne Victory were eliminated in the play-off round.

Group stage

Group G

Group H

Men's football

A-League Men

National Premier Leagues

The Final Series was not held.

Cup competitions

FFA Cup

A-Leagues All Stars Game

Women's football

A-League Women

Deaths
 3 January 2022: Ulysses Kokkinos, 74, former South Melbourne Hellas, Fitzroy United, Hakoah Eastern Suburbs, Melbourne Juventus, West Adelaide Hellas, Western Suburbs, and Floreat Athena forward.
 14 March 2022: Colin Kitching, 88, former Bundamba, Blackstone United, St Helens United, Hellenic, and Australia forward.

Retirements
 14 September 2021: Wayne Brown, 33, former Newcastle Jets midfielder.
 19 September 2021: Christine Nairn, 30, former United States and Melbourne Victory midfielder.
 24 September 2021: Lisa De Vanna, 36, former Australia, Adelaide Sensation, Western Waves, Perth Glory, Brisbane Roar, Newcastle Jets, Melbourne Victory, Melbourne City, North Shore Mariners, Canberra United, South Melbourne, and Sydney FC forward.
 28 September 2021: Steven Taylor, 35, former Wellington Phoenix defender.
 30 September 2021: Ronald Vargas, 34, former Venezuela and Newcastle Jets forward.
 15 October 2021: Simon Cox, 34, former Ireland and Western Sydney Wanderers forward.
 23 October 2021: Adam Federici, 36, former Australia and Macarthur FC goalkeeper.
 28 October 2021: Daniel Georgievski, 33, former Macedonia, Melbourne Victory, Newcastle Jets, Western Sydney Wanderers, and Melbourne City defender.
 12 November 2021: Joe Ledley, 34, former Wales and Newcastle Jets midfielder.
 27 January 2022: Besart Berisha, 36, former Albania, Kosovo, Brisbane Roar, Melbourne Victory, and Western United forward.
 9 March 2022: Zac Anderson, 30, former Gold Coast United, Central Coast Mariners, Sydney FC, and Olympic FC defender.
 30 April 2022: Andy Keogh, 35, former Republic of Ireland and Perth Glory forward.
 7 May 2022: Bobô, 37, former Sydney FC forward.
 20 May 2022: Louis Fenton, 29, former New Zealand and Wellington Phoenix defender.
 22 May 2022: Joseph Mills, 32, former Perth Glory defender.

Comebacks
 23 November 2021: Ashleigh Sykes, 28, former Australia international forward who retired in 2018 and signed with Canberra United.
 25 November 2021: Lisa De Vanna, 36, former Australia international forward who retired in September 2021 and signed with Perth Glory.

References

External links
 Football Australia official website

2021 in Australian soccer
2022 in Australian soccer
Seasons in Australian soccer